Il Cimento dell′ Armonia e dell′ Inventione (The Contest Between Harmony and Invention) is a set of twelve concertos written by Antonio Vivaldi and published in 1725 as Op. 8. All are for violin solo, strings and basso continuo. The first four, which date back to 1718–23, are called The Four Seasons (Le quattro stagioni). The set was published in the Amsterdam workshop of Michel-Charles Le Cène and dedicated to Wenceslas, Count of Morzin, an advisor to Charles VI, Holy Roman Emperor (not to be confused with Karl Joseph, Count Morzin, benefactor of Joseph Haydn).

List of concertos

Concerto No. 1 in E major, "La primavera" (Spring), RV 269
Concerto No. 2 in G minor, "L'estate" (Summer), RV 315
Concerto No. 3 in F major, "L'autunno" (Autumn), RV 293
Concerto No. 4 in F minor, "L'inverno" (Winter), RV 297
Concerto No. 5 in E-flat major, "La tempesta di mare" (The Storm at Sea or The Sea Storm), RV 253
Concerto No. 6 in C major, "Il piacere" (Pleasure), RV 180
Concerto No. 7 in D minor, "Per Pisendel" (For Pisendel), RV 242
Concerto No. 8 in G minor, RV 332
Concerto No. 9 in D minor, RV 236 (scored for violin) / RV 454 (scored for oboe)
Concerto No. 10 in B-flat major, "La caccia" (The Hunt), RV 362
Concerto No. 11 in D major, RV 210
Concerto No. 12 in C major, RV 178 (scored for violin) / RV 449 (scored for oboe)

References

External links

Scores and Parts: Vivaldi Op. 8

Vivaldi
Concertos by Antonio Vivaldi
Music dedicated to nobility or royalty
1725 compositions